All Pro Dad is the fatherhood program of Family First, a national non-profit organization based in Tampa, Florida. Launched in 1997 by Mark Merrill with the help of Tony Dungy, former head coach of the 2006 Super Bowl champion Indianapolis Colts, All Pro Dad is built on a football theme and features more than 50 NFL players, coaches and alumni who speak out on the importance of being a good father.

Outreach
The "Play of the Day", its daily email, is received by more than 40,000 subscribers. There are currently 931 "All Pro Dad’s Day" chapters at public schools in 48 states in nine countries, where more than 40,000 fathers and their kids gather. Held at NFL venues nationwide, the "Father & Kids Experience" is an event where fathers and children participate together in football activities. The "All Pro Dad Father & Kids Experience" has hosted more than 50,000 fathers and kids, in over 50 of these events since 2002 in 20 different NFL cites. The "Father & Kids Experience" also made its debut in college football in 2009, with events hosted by the University of Georgia's Mark Richt, and Florida State University's Bobby Bowden.

References

External links
 All Pro Dad

Non-profit organizations based in Florida
Fatherhood
Organizations established in 1997
1997 establishments in Florida
Organizations based in Tampa, Florida